Acrobasis nuxvorella, the pecan nut casebearer, is a moth of the family Pyralidae described by Herbert H. Neunzig  in 1970. It is found in the United States in eastern New Mexico, Texas, Oklahoma, Louisiana, Missouri, southern Illinois, Mississippi, Alabama, Florida, Georgia, South Carolina and North Carolina.

The larvae feed on Carya illinoensis. It is the most damaging insect pest of pecans in Texas. The larvae feed first on buds below the cluster, then attack the nuts. They enter the nuts by cutting a circular hole in the base. As they feed, they push frass out the hole where it accumulates. A single larva may destroy the entire cluster, before pupating in one of the last nuts fed upon.

References

Moths described in 1970
Acrobasis
Moths of North America